The 2020 Intrust Super Cup was the PNG Hunters seventh season in the Queensland Cup after securing their future with a four year license from 2019 until 2022. A 28 man squad was announced for the season. However the 2020 QRL season was suspended on 17 March after Round 1 due to the Covid-19 pandemic.

Season Summary

2020 squad

Squad movement

Gains

Losses

Ladder 

 The team highlighted in blue has clinched the minor premiership
 Teams highlighted in green have qualified for the finals
 The team highlighted in red has clinched the wooden spoon

Fixtures

Pre-season

Regular season

Statistics

Honours

References

Queensland Cup
2020 in Australian rugby league
2020 in rugby league by club